Perth was a provincial riding in Ontario, Canada, which was created for the 1934 election. It was abolished prior to the 1999 election. It was merged into the riding of Perth-Middlesex.

Members of Provincial Parliament

References

Notes

Citations

Former provincial electoral districts of Ontario